Advanced Materials is a weekly peer-reviewed scientific journal covering materials science. It includes communications, reviews, and feature articles on topics in chemistry, physics, nanotechnology, ceramics, metallurgy, and biomaterials. According to the Journal Citation Reports, the journal has a 2021 impact factor of 32.086.

History
The journal was established in 1988 as a supplement to the general chemistry journal Angewandte Chemie and remained part of that journal for the first 18 months of its existence. Founder and editor-in-chief was Peter Goelitz (then editor of Angewandte Chemie). The current editor-in-chief is Jos Lenders.

Originally the journal appeared monthly; it switched to 15 issues in 1997, 18 issues in 1998, and 24 issues in 2000. In 2009, it started to publish weekly, with 48 issues per year. Since 2018, it publishes 52 issues per year.

Sister journals
As the volume of research in materials science increased significantly since the 1990s, several journals have been spun off, including:
Advanced Engineering Materials, 1999
Advanced Functional Materials, 2001
Small, 2005
Advanced Energy Materials, 2011
Advanced Healthcare Materials, 2012
Advanced Optical Materials, 2013
Advanced Materials Interfaces, 2014
Advanced Electronic Materials, 2015
Advanced Materials Technologies, 2016
Small Methods, 2017
Solar RRL, 2017
Advanced Therapeutics, 2018
Advanced Intelligent Systems, 2019

References

External links

Materials science journals
Publications established in 1989
English-language journals
Weekly journals
Wiley-VCH academic journals
Nanotechnology journals